Jarpal, or Bara Pind (Punjabi),  is a village of Zafarwal, Narowal, Punjab, Pakistan. It is located in the northeastern corner of Punjab and is geographically situated at 75E and 32N.

History
The Battle of Jarpal Barapind or the Battle of Basantar (December 4–16, 1971) was one of the vital battles fought in this village as part of the Indo-Pakistani War of 1971 in the eastern sector of Pakistan. Before the partition of India in 1947, its name was Bara Pind Lohtian.

Peer Syed Sardar Ali Shah left India and settled in Pakistan on the occasion of the partition of India and Pakistan.  And on this, keep striving for the prosperity and development of the village. 
Malik Shah Din (former Member Provincial Assembly)
Shiv Kumar Batalvi, A famous Indian poet
Rana Shahbaz Ahmad (Tehsil Naib Nazim Shahkargarh , businessman , Social Activist, MD at Superior college Zafarwal)
Lt Col Iftikhar Ahmad(Army Officier and Social Activist)
Muhammad Farooq (journalist)
Muhib Rasool

References

Villages in Narowal District